Merangin Football Club, commonly known as simply Merangin FC, is a Indonesia association football club based in Merangin Regency, Jambi. The football club currently plays in Liga 3 which is the last tier in Indonesian football. In 2016, Merangin FC became the champion of 2016 ISC Liga Nusantara Jambi zone, as well as representing Jambi province in the national round of Liga Nusantara.

Stadium

Merangin FC play their home matches at Bumi Masurai Stadium

Honours
 Liga Nusantara Jambi
 Champion: 2016
 Jambi's Governor Cup : 
 Champions (1): 2012, 2019, and 2020
 Runner-up (2): 2009, 2011, 2013, and 2015

References

External links
 Merangin FC at Facebook
 Merangin FC at Instagram

Football clubs in Indonesia
Football clubs in Jambi
Association football clubs established in 1970
1970 establishments in Indonesia